Aspergillus spectabilis is a species of fungus in the genus Aspergillus. It is from the Aenei section. The species was first described in 1978.

Growth and morphology

A. spectabilis has been cultivated on both Czapek yeast extract agar (CYA) plates and Malt Extract Agar Oxoid® (MEAOX) plates. The growth morphology of the colonies can be seen in the pictures below.

References 

spectabilis
Fungi described in 1978